89th parallel may refer to:

89th parallel north, a circle of latitude in the Northern Hemisphere, in the Arctic Ocean
89th parallel south, a circle of latitude in the Southern Hemisphere, in Antarctica